The 1964 Queen's Birthday Honours in New Zealand, celebrating the official birthday of Elizabeth II, were appointments made by the Queen on the advice of the New Zealand government to various orders and honours to reward and highlight good works by New Zealanders. They were announced on 13 June 1964.

The recipients of honours are displayed here as they were styled before their new honour.

Knight Bachelor
 The Honourable Ronald Macmillan Algie – Speaker of the House of Representatives.
 John Davies Wilder Ormond  – chairman of the New Zealand Meat Producers Board.
 Carl Victor Smith  – of Dunedin. For public services.

Order of Saint Michael and Saint George

Companion (CMG)
 Thomas Frederick Corkill    – senior obstetrician in Wellington.
 Jack Kent Hunn – permanent head, Ministry of Defence.

Order of the British Empire

Knight Commander (KBE)
Military division
 Rear Admiral Peter Phipps   – Royal New Zealand Navy.

Commander  (CBE)
Civil division
 Ian Burman Gow  – of Bay of Plenty. For services to the dairy industry.
 John Faulks Landreth  – of Christchurch. For services to the medical profession.
 James Hislop Parker  – of Raumati South. For services to the fruit industry.
 Norman Berridge Spencer – of Auckland. For services in the fields of philanthropy and community welfare.

Military division
 Captain John O'Connell Ross – Royal New Zealand Navy.

Officer (OBE)
Civil division
 Eric Tewsley Dawson  – lately superintendent of the Bay of Plenty Hospital Board.
 Charles Jackson Garland – of Auckland. For public services.
 Maurice William Grantham . For community welfare services, especially as secretary of the Southland Old People's Welfare Council.
 Cyril Geoffrey Edmund Harker – of Waipawa. For public services.
 Hugh Pearson McIntyre  – of Gore. For services to local government and to farming.
 Matina Makiha – of Whakarewarewa. For services to the Māori people.
 Denis Rogers   – mayor of Hamilton.
 William Henry Gray Russell Sarney  – of Ashburton. For services to the community and to sport.
 Irene Tolerton – matron-in-chief. Wellington Public Hospital.
 William Simon Wauchop – of Wellington. For services to art, drama and librarianship.
 Hugh Robinson Whitehead – director of the Dairy Research Institute, Massey University College, Palmerston North.

Military division
 Commander Morris Aaron Lawson – Royal New Zealand Navy.
 Lieutenant-Colonel Peter Hulbert Glenn Hamilton – Royal New Zealand Engineers (Regular Force).
 Group Captain Kenneth William Trigance  – Royal New Zealand Air Force.

Member (MBE)
Civil division
 Joseph Allan  – of Lake Pukaki. For services to local government and to farming.
 Catherine Raincliff Ashton – of Auckland. For services to the community, particularly in the interests of children and the elderly.
 Edmund Peter Cahill – deputy superintendent, Paparua Prison, Christchurch.
 Rebecca Noble-Campbell – of Wairoa. For services to the community, especially in connection with the welfare of women.
 Emily Bessie Cannell – of New Plymouth. For services to education and child welfare.
 The Reverend Robert Lye Challis – minister in New Zealand in charge of the welfare of Pacific Islanders.
 Gertrude Charlotte Dunn  – of Lower Hutt. For services to the community.
 Walter James Egington – of Motueka. For services to local government.
 The Reverend Archibald Macfarlane Elliffe – superintendent of the Otago Presbyterian Social Services Association.
 Alister Hay Goyder – of Blenheim. For services to local government.
 George Andrew Holmes – superintendent of the Invermay Research Station.
 The Reverend Mutu Paratene Kapa – of Tuakau. For services to the Māori people.
 Clark McConachy – of Auckland. For community and charitable services.
 Margaret Kate McCorkindale. For social welfare services, especially in connection with the Feilding Plunket Society.
 Roland Keith Milne – of Christchurch. For services to the community in educational and welfare fields.
 Albert Edward Naulls . For services to Government House, Wellington.
 James Joseph Hamilton Nisbet  – of Hikurangi. For services to the community, especially in connection with the Returned Services' Association.
 Kenneth James Strange  – of Nelson. For services to the community, especially in connection with the Returned Services' Association.
 Michael Joseph Sullivan  – of Westland. For services to local government and community welfare.
 John Leddra Wallis – chairman of the Otorohanga County Council.

Military division
 Temporary Lieutenant Commander (SP) Allyn Mason Finlayson – Royal New Zealand Naval Volunteer Reserve.
 Major William Alexander French  – New Zealand Scottish Regiment (Territorial Force).
 Major Peter William Frank Joplin – Royal Regiment of New Zealand Artillery (Regular Force).
 Warrant Officer First Class Henry George Charles Salt – Royal Regiment of New Zealand Artillery (Regular Force).
 Major Lloyd James Sanders – Royal New Zealand Infantry Regiment (Regular Force).
 Squadron Leader Geoffrey Bentley – Royal New Zealand Air Force.
 Squadron Leader James Dermot Hurley – Royal New Zealand Air Force.

Companion of the Imperial Service Order (ISO)
 Keith Menzies – lately Assistant Secretary of Justice.
 David Archibald Wraight – lately Navy Secretary.

British Empire Medal (BEM)
Civil division, for gallantry
 John Isaac Beardsley – constable, New Zealand Police Force. For arresting an armed and intoxicated criminal.

Civil division
 Ernest David Fraser – sergeant, New Zealand Police Force.

Military division
 Chief Petty Officer Cook (O) Keith Lionel Mack – Royal New Zealand Navy.
 Chief Ordnance Artificer Arthur Hamilton Norris – Royal New Zealand Navy.
 Stores Chief Petty Officer Selwyn Desmond Walter – Royal New Zealand Navy.
 Chief Radio Supervisor Anthony James Edmond Woolford – Royal New Zealand Naval Volunteer Reserve.
 Sergeant Ruth Gertrude Kirton – New Zealand Women's Royal Army Corps (Regular Force).
 Sergeant Ronald William Rowe – Royal New Zealand Infantry Regiment.
 Flight Sergeant Alan Peter Longley – Royal New Zealand Air Force.
 Flight Sergeant Henry Dickson Richmond – Royal New Zealand Air Force.

Air Force Cross (AFC)
 Squadron Leader Russell George Archer – Royal New Zealand Air Force.
 Flight Lieutenant Murray Davis Peacock – Royal New Zealand Air Force.
 Master Engineer David John Abercromby  – Royal New Zealand Air Force.

Queen's Police Medal (QPM)
 William Raymond Fell – assistant commissioner, New Zealand Police Force.

Queen's Commendation for Valuable Service in the Air
 Master Signaller Michael Patrick Joseph Phillips – Royal New Zealand Air Force.

References

Birthday Honours
1964 awards
1964 in New Zealand
New Zealand awards